The 33rd Lambda Literary Awards were announced on June 1, 2021, to honour works of LGBT literature published in 2020. Due to the COVID-19 pandemic in the United States, there was no public ceremony; instead, the winners were announced in a livestreamed virtual gala.

Nominees were announced in March 2021.

Special awards

Nominees and winners

References

Lambda
2021 in LGBT history
Lambda Literary Awards
Lists of LGBT-related award winners and nominees
Lambda
Lambda